German submarine U-880 was a Type IXC/40 U-boat built for Nazi Germany's Kriegsmarine during World War II.

Design
German Type IXC/40 submarines were slightly larger than the original Type IXCs. U-880 had a displacement of  when at the surface and  while submerged. She had two shafts and two  propellers.

U-880 was fitted with six  torpedo tubes (four fitted at the bow and two at the stern), 22 torpedoes, one  SK C/32 naval gun, 180 rounds, and a  Flak M42 as well as two twin  C/30 anti-aircraft guns. The boat had a complement of forty-eight.

Service history
U-880 was ordered on 2 April 1942 from DeSchiMAG AG Weser in Bremen under the yard number 1088. Her keel was laid down on 17 July 1943 and the U-boat was launched the following year on 10 February 1944. She was commissioned into service under the command of Kapitänleutnant Gerhard Schötzau (Crew 36) in 4th U-boat Flotilla.

After completing training, U-880 was transferred to the 33rd U-boat Flotilla and left base for her first war patrol on 23 January 1945. Mechanical failures, however, forced her to return prematurely in two cases. She finally left Bergen for the West Atlantic on 14 March 1945. She joined group Seewolf in April, but was picked up by Task Force 22.5 before she could attack any ships.  made radar-contact with the U-boat just after midnight on 16 April. Frost and  chased the submerged U-boat for several hours and finally attacked U-880 with hedgehogs, sinking her. There were no survivors.

References

Bibliography

External links

World War II submarines of Germany
German Type IX submarines
1944 ships
U-boats commissioned in 1944
U-boats sunk in 1945
U-boats sunk by US warships
U-boats sunk by depth charges
Ships built in Bremen (state)
Ships lost with all hands
Maritime incidents in April 1945